Forest for the Trees is a Canadian documentary film, directed by Rita Leistner and released in 2021. The film documents a group of tree planters in British Columbia, and the challenging and arduous conditions they deal with in the process of the job.

The film premiered on May 6, 2021, at the DOXA Documentary Film Festival. It was released alongside a companion book by Leistner and Don McKellar, featuring her photographs of tree planters.

Leistner received a Canadian Screen Award nomination for Best Cinematography in a Documentary at the 10th Canadian Screen Awards in 2022.

References

External links

2021 films
2021 documentary films
Canadian documentary films
Films shot in British Columbia
2020s English-language films
2020s Canadian films